The pound of force or pound-force (symbol: lbf, sometimes lbf,) is a unit of force used in some systems of measurement, including English Engineering units and the foot–pound–second system. 

Pound-force should not be confused with pound-mass (lb), often simply called pound, which is a unit of mass, nor should these be confused with foot-pound (ft⋅lbf), a unit of energy, or pound-foot (lbf⋅ft), a unit of torque.

Definitions 
The pound-force is equal to the gravitational force exerted on a mass of one avoirdupois pound on the surface of Earth. Since the 18th century, the unit has been used in low-precision measurements, for which small changes in Earth's gravity (which varies from equator to pole by up to half a percent) can safely be neglected.

The 20th century, however, brought the need for a more precise definition, requiring a standardized value for acceleration due to gravity.

Product of avoirdupois pound and standard gravity 
The pound-force is the product of one avoirdupois pound (exactly ) and the standard acceleration due to gravity, .

The standard values of acceleration of the standard gravitational field (gn) and the international avoirdupois pound (lb) result in a pound-force equal to 
.

This definition can be rephrased in terms of the slug. A slug has a mass of 32.174049 lb.

Conversion to other units

Foot–pound–second (FPS) systems of units 

In some contexts, the term "pound" is used almost exclusively to refer to the unit of force and not the unit of mass. In those applications, the preferred unit of mass is the slug, i.e. lbf⋅s2/ft. In other contexts, the unit "pound" refers to a unit of mass.  The international standard symbol for the pound as a unit of mass is lb. 

In the "engineering" systems (middle column), the weight of the mass unit (pound-mass) on Earth's surface is approximately equal to the force unit (pound-force). This is convenient because one pound mass exerts one pound force due to gravity. Note, however, unlike the other systems the force unit is not equal to the mass unit multiplied by the acceleration unit—the use of Newton's second law, requires another factor, gc, usually taken to be 32.174049 (lb⋅ft)/(lbf⋅s2).
"Absolute" systems are coherent systems of units: by using the slug as the unit of mass, the "gravitational" FPS system (left column) avoids the need for such a constant. The SI is an "absolute" metric system with kilogram and meter as base units.

Pound of thrust

The term pound of thrust is an alternative name for pound-force in specific contexts. It is frequently seen in US sources on jet engines and rocketry, some of which continue to use the FPS notation.

See also 

 Foot-pound (energy)
 Ton-force
 Kip (unit)
 Mass in general relativity 
 Mass in special relativity 
 Mass versus weight for the difference between the two physical properties
 Newton
 Poundal
 Pounds per square inch, a unit of pressure

Notes and references

General sources 
 Obert, Edward  F. (1948). Thermodynamics. New York: D. J. Leggett Book Company. Chapter I "Survey of Dimensions and Units", pp. 1-24.

Customary units of measurement in the United States
Imperial units
Units of force